GPSBabel is a cross-platform, free software to transfer routes, tracks, and waypoint data to and from consumer GPS units, and to convert between GPS data formats. It has a command-line interface and a graphical interface for Windows, macOS, and  Linux users.

GPSBabel is part of many Linux distributions including Debian and Fedora, and also part of the Fink and Homebrew systems for getting Unix software on macOS.

Applications 
Many contributors to OpenStreetMap use GPSBabel to convert GPS track data from proprietary formats to the GPX format OpenStreetMap requires.

GPSBabel is popular in the Geocaching community because it enables people with incompatible GPS units to share data.

Geographic information system (GIS) applications such as QGIS and Grass use GPSBabel for many import and export operations and processing.

Photographers frequently use GPSBabel for geotagging images, associating location with photographs. This relies on GPS data loggers, either external or internal to the camera.

GPSBabel enables owners of many different brands of GPS units to view their GPS data in several popular consumer map programs, such as Google Earth and Microsoft Streets & Trips.

Notes

References 
 "GPS Running Log", Make Magazine, vol. 7, pp. 117–118.

Further reading

External links 
 
 GpsPrune can also act as a frontend

Free GIS software
Free software programmed in C
Satellite navigation software
Free software programmed in C++
Software that uses Qt